Ranmuiy is a 2001 Maldivian drama film directed by Abdulla Sujau and Abdul Faththaah. Produced by Abdul Muhaimin, the film stars Ismail Wajeeh and Aishath Ibrahim in pivotal roles. The film was heavily marketed for its item song titled "Bahdhaluvumun Vejje Dheewana" featuring Indian actress Rajeshwari which was initially planned with Bollywood actress Juhi Chawla but had to cut short after she sprained her ankle while trying to board a speedboat.

Premise
The film is centered on the dispute between a daughter and her step-mother. Waheed (Ismail Wajeeh) a simple widower goes to an island and is instantly attracted to Shakeela (Aishath Ibrahim) a middle-class ill-mannered young woman. They marry and Shakeela is brought to Waheed's house. Complications arise when Shakeela personally attacks her step-daughter, Reesha (Amira Amir) while interfering with her personal life.

Cast 
 Ismail Wajeeh as Waheed
 Aishath Ibrahim as Shakeela
 Amira Amir as Reesha
 Adnan Abdul Raheem as Azheem
 Ahmed Naseer as Adil
 Aminath Rasheedha as Kuda Kamana
 Ismail Zahir as Zahir
 Ibrahim Rasheed as Ibrahim
 Mariyam Shakeela as Azza
 Ibrahim Afeef as Rasheed
 Hamid Wajeeh as Idrees
 Mariyam Haleem as Azheem's mother
 Sara as Safiyya
 Rajeshwari (Special appearance in the song "Bahdhaluvumun Vejje Dheewana")

Soundtrack

References

Maldivian drama films
2001 films
Films directed by Abdul Faththaah
2001 drama films
Dhivehi-language films